DYVL may refer to:
 DYVL-AM, an AM radio station broadcasting in Tacloban, branded as Aksyon Radyo.
 DYVL-FM, an FM radio station broadcasting in Bogo, Cebu, branded as 94.1 Cool Radio.